is a Japanese footballer currently playing as an attacking midfielder and as a forward for the J1 League club Kashima Antlers.

Youth career
Beginning his career at his hometown club Roasso Kumamoto in their junior youth section, he went on to attend Higashi Fukuoka High School. In 2018, he represented Japan U16 in the AFC U16 Championship. In Japan's first game in the tournament, he won the man of the match award after scoring two goals in a 5-2 win over Thailand. Japan went on to win the tournament, with Araki appearing in every game except for the semi-final. In his second year at Higashi Fukuoka HS, he was handed the number 10 shirt and was made captain of the team. Over two seasons, Araki made 30 appearances for the school scoring 10 goals across the Prince Takamado Cup, the All Japan High School Soccer Tournament, and the Inter Highschool Championship.

Club career
In October 2019, it was announced that Araki would join Kashima Antlers for the 2020 season, after graduating from Higashi Fukuoka High School. He made his debut for Kashima Antlers on 23 February 2020, coming on as a substitute in a 3-0 league defeat to Sanfrecce Hiroshima. He scored his first professional goal later on that season, scoring a 94th minute equaliser in a 2-2 draw against Vissel Kobe. He made 29 appearances in his debut season aged just 18 years old, and scored two league goals during the 2020 season. He improved his already impressive form in his second season, with almost 3000 minutes in 46 appearances across all competitions. In the 2021 J1 League, he scored 10 league goals and made 6 assists, totalling 16 goal contributions; the fifth most goal contributions in the league. He also was the first under-20 player to score a double-digit number of goals since Shoji Jo in 1994. His performances throughout the season rewarded him the J.League Rookie of the Year award.

Career statistics

Club
.

Honors
Individual
J.League Rookie of the Year: 2021

References

External links

Profile at Kashima Antlers

2002 births
Living people
Japanese footballers
Japan youth international footballers
Association football midfielders
Association football people from Kumamoto Prefecture
J1 League players
Kashima Antlers players